Ahmed Paidayesh (born 4 November 1947) is an Iranian water polo player. He competed in the men's tournament at the 1976 Summer Olympics.

References

1947 births
Living people
People from Tehran
Iranian male water polo players
Olympic water polo players of Iran
Water polo players at the 1976 Summer Olympics
Asian Games gold medalists for Iran
Asian Games medalists in water polo
Water polo players at the 1974 Asian Games
Medalists at the 1974 Asian Games
20th-century Iranian people